This article about the demographics of Switzerland features the population of the Swiss Confederation, including population density, ethnicity, education level, health of the populace, economic status, religious affiliations and other aspects of the population.

Switzerland had a population of 8.57 million as of mid-2019. Its population quadrupled over the period 1800 to 1990 (average doubling time 95 years). Population growth was steepest in the period after World War II (1.4% per annum during 1950–1970, doubling time 50 years), it slowed during the 1970s to 1980s and has since again picked up to 1% during the 2000s (doubling time 70 years).

More than 75% of the population live in the central plain, which stretches between the Alps and the Jura Mountains and from Geneva in the southwest to the High Rhine and Lake Constance in the northeast.

As of 2019, foreign residents in the country make up 25.2% of the population.

Census

The Federal Population Census has been carried out every 10 years starting in 1850. The census was initiated by Federal Councillor Stefano Franscini, who evaluated the data of the first census all by himself after Parliament failed to provide the necessary funds. The census is now being conducted by the Swiss Federal Statistical Office, which makes most results available on its website.

Collected data includes population data (citizenship, place of residence, place of birth, position in household, number of children, religion, languages, education, profession, place of work, etc.), household data (number of individuals living in the household, etc.), accommodation data (surface area, amount of rent paid, etc.) and building data (geocoordinates, time of construction, number of floors, etc.). Participation is compulsory and reached 99.87% of the population in 2000.

Since 2010, the population census has been carried out and analysed annually in a new format by the Federal Statistical Office (FSO). In order to ease the burden on the population, the information is primarily drawn from population registers and supplemented by sample surveys. Only a small proportion of the population (about 5%) are surveyed in writing or by telephone. The first reference day for the new census was 31 December 2010.

Population 
Demographic statistics according to the World Population Review in 2019.
One birth every 6 minutes
One death every 8 minutes
One net migrant every 11 minutes
Net gain of one person every 8 minutes
Total of registered residents (numbers relate to 31 December):

Growth rate 
During the 19th and 20th centuries, population growth rate has been at 0.7% to 0.8%, with a doubling time of ca. 90 years. In the later 20th century, the growth rate has fallen below 0.7% (1980s: 0.64%; 1990s: 0.65%), and in the 2000s it has risen again slightly (2000–2006: 0.69%), mostly due to immigration. In 2007 the population grew at a much higher 1.1% rate, again mostly due to immigration. For 2008, the population grew 1.6%, a level not seen since the early 1960s.

Total fertility rate
1.46 children born/woman (total)
1.33 children born/Swiss woman
1.86 children born/non-Swiss woman

Fertility 

The total fertility rate is the number of children born per woman. It is based on fairly good data for the entire period. Sources: Our World In Data and Gapminder Foundation.

Age structure 

Data: Swiss Federal Statistics Office

As population growth curbs, the percentage of elderly people increases. In July 2015, the Swiss Federal Office of Statistics published a projection estimating that by 2045, the ratio of residents over the retirement age of 65 would climb to 48.1 per 100 residents between 20 and 64 years old, and possibly as high as 50.0 in the highest case.  In 2015 that ratio was only 29.1 per 100 residents.

Data: Swiss Federal Statistics Office

Sex ratio 

Data: Swiss Federal Statistics Office 2007

Life expectancy 

According to statistics released by the federal government in 2019, life expectancy stands at 81.9 years for men and 85.6 years for women, for an overall average of 83.8 years for the populace as a whole.

Sources: Our World In Data

1850-1950

1950 to 2015

Source: UN World Population Prospects

Vital statistics 

Data according to Statistik Schweiz, United Nations, Our World In Data and Gapminder Foundation.

Current vital statistics

Nationality 

Unlike many other OECD countries, the Swiss Federal Statistical Office does not collect any data on racial identity or ethnic identity. Data is collected on country of birth, but as the OECD write "In general, collecting migration-related information on the foreign-born population and their children is a crude method for capturing diversity."

Encompassing the Central Alps, Switzerland sits at the crossroads of several major European cultures. Its population includes a two-thirds majority of Alemannic German speakers and a one-quarter Latin minority (French, Italian and Romansh), see linguistic geography of Switzerland. 10% of the population natively speak an immigrant language.

Switzerland consistently ranks high on quality of life indices, including per capita income, concentration of computer and internet usage per capita, insurance coverage per individual, and health care rates. For these and many other reasons, such as the four languages, it serves as an excellent test market for businesses hoping to introduce new products into Europe.

Permanent residents by nationality
The number of registered resident foreigners was 1,001,887 (16.17%) in 1970. This amount decreased to 904,337 (14.34%) in 1979, and has increased steadily since that time, passing the 20% mark during 2001 and rising to 1,524,663 (20.56%) in 2004. The number of Swiss citizens thus numbered about 5.9 million in that year.

In 2013 there were a total of 1,937,447 permanent residents (23.8% of the total population of 8.14 million) in Switzerland. Of these, 1.65 million resident foreigners (85.0%, or 20.2% of the 8.14 million total population), had European citizenship (Italian: 298,875; German: 292,291; Portuguese: 253,227; French: 110,103; Serbian: 90,704; Kosovan: 86,976; Spanish: 75,333, Macedonian: 62,633; British: 40,898; Austrian: 39,494; Bosnian and Herzegovinian: 33,002; Croatian: 30,471). From other continents; 122,941 residents were from Asia; 83,873 from Africa; 78,433 from the Americas; and 4,145 from Oceania.

The following chart shows permanent resident numbers from selected regions and countries every 5 years.

Source:

Tamil refugees fleeing from war in Sri Lanka are the largest number of Asians, while Albanians and former Yugoslavians continue to grow in number. Switzerland is also the second largest European country in number of acceptance of Iraqi refugees fleeing from the violence in Iraq since 2003, but behind Great Britain, Germany and Sweden in the number of Iraqis taken residence for a European country.

Naturalization
In 2004, 35,700 people acquired Swiss citizenship according to Swiss nationality law, a figure slightly larger than that of the previous year (35,424), and four times larger than the 1990 figure (8,658). About a third of those naturalized are from a successor state of former Yugoslavia: 7,900 Serbia-Montenegro, 2,400 Bosnia-Herzegovina, 2,000 North Macedonia, 1,600 Croatia. 4,200 were from Italy, 3,600 from Turkey, 1,600 from Sri Lanka, 1,200 from Portugal, and 1,200 from France.

The yearly rate of naturalization has quintupled over the 1990s and 2000s, from roughly 9,000 to 45,000. Relative to the population of resident foreigners, this amounts to an increase from 8% in 1990 to 27% in 2007, or relative to the number of Swiss citizens from 1.6% in 1990 to 7.3% in 2007.

The following table shows the historical development of naturalization from selected countries.

Immigration

Foreign population by country of citizenship as of 2020:

Emigration

In 2004, 623,100 Swiss citizens (8.9%) lived abroad, the largest group in France (166,200), followed by the United States (71,400) and Germany (70,500).

Employment and income 
Unemployment, youth ages 15–24
total: 8.1%. Country comparison to the world: 138th
male: 8.1% 
female: 8% (2017 est.)
Average hourly income

23.14 CHF

Religion 

Switzerland as a federal state has no state religion, though most of the cantons (except for Geneva and Neuchâtel) recognize official churches (Landeskirchen), in all cases including the Roman Catholic Church and the Swiss Reformed Church. These churches, and in some cantons also the Old Catholic Church and Jewish congregations, are financed by official taxation of adherents.

In 2000, 5.78 million residents (79.2%, compared to 93.8% in 1980) were Christian (Roman Catholic 41.8%, Protestant 35.3%, Orthodox 1.8%). 809,800 (11.1%, compared to 3.8% in 1980) were without any religious affiliation. 310,800 (4.3%) were Muslim (compared to 0.9% in 1980), 17,900 (0.2%) were Jewish. The 2005 Eurobarometer poll found 48% of Swiss residents to be theist, 39% expressing belief in "some sort of spirit or life force", 9% atheist and 4% said that they "don't know".

Adherence to Christian churches has declined considerably since the late 20th century, from close to 94% in 1980 to about 67% as of 2016. Furthermore, notable is the significant difference in church adherence between Swiss citizens (72%) and foreign nationals (51%) in 2016.

The Federal Statistical Office reported the religious demographics as of 2016 as follows (based on the resident population age 15 years and older):
66.9% Christian (including 36.5% Roman Catholic, 24.5% Reformed, 5.9% other),
24.9% unaffiliated,
5.2% Muslim, 
0.3% Jewish,
1.4% other religions.
(100%: 6,981,381, registered resident population age 15 years and older). From the same 2016 survey, of 15 to 24 year olds 65.4% were Christian (36.3% Roman Catholic, 22.6% Reformed, 6.6% other), 23.0% unaffiliated, 0.3% Jewish, 8.3% Muslim, 1.7% other religions. Those aged 25 to 44 were 58.4% Christian (33.1% Roman Catholic, 18.7% Reformed, 6.7% other), 31.0% unaffiliated, 0.2% Jewish, 7.5% Muslim, 1.7% other religions. Older adults (45 to 64 years old) were 67.0% Christian (37.7% Roman Catholic, 23.9% Reformed, 5.5% other), 25.9% unaffiliated, 0.2% Jewish, 4.2% Muslim, 1.5% other religions. Senior citizens (over 65) were 81.3% Christian (40.3% Roman Catholic, 36.2% Reformed, 4.8% other), 14.9% unaffiliated, 0.3% Jewish, 1.1% Muslim, 0.5% other religions.

Languages

The four national languages of Switzerland are German, French, Italian and Romansh.
In 2017, permanent residents who spoke German (mostly Swiss German dialects) as their main language or co-main language numbered about 63% (5.2 million), followed by 22.9% (1.9 million) for French (mostly Swiss French, but including some Franco-Provençal dialects), 8.2% (678,000) for Italian (mostly Swiss Italian, but including Insubric dialects) and less than 0.5% (44,000) for Romansh.

The non-official language with the largest group of main or co-main language speakers (in 2017) is English with 448,000 speakers, followed by Portuguese with 303,000, Albanian with 262,000, followed by Serbo-Croatian with 205,000 speakers and Spanish with 197,000. All other languages totaled 640,000.

Education

Almost all Swiss are literate. Switzerland's 13 institutes of higher learning enrolled 99,600 students in the academic year of 2001–02. About 25% of the adult population hold a diploma of higher learning. According to the CIA World Factbook data for 2003, 99% of the Swiss population aged 15 and over could read and write, with the rate being identical for both sexes.

During the 2008/09 school year there were 1,502,257 students in the entire Swiss educational system. In kindergarten or pre-school, there were 152,919 students (48.6% female). These students were taught by 13,592 teachers (96.0% female) in 4,949 schools, of which 301 were private schools. There were 777,394 students (48.6% female) in the obligatory schools, which include primary and lower secondary schools. These students were taught by 74,501 teachers (66.3% female) in 6,083 schools, of which 614 were private. The upper secondary school system had 337,145 students (46.9% female). They were taught by 13,900 teachers (42.3% female) in 730 schools, of which 240 were private. The tertiary education system had 234,799 students (49.7% female). They were taught by 37,546 teachers (32.8% female) in 367 schools.

Regional disparities

Source:

Crime

The police registered a total of 553,421 criminal offences in 2009, including 51 killings and 185 attempted murders. There were 616 cases of rape. In the same year, 94,574 adults (85% of them male, 47.4% of them Swiss citizens) were convicted under criminal law. 57.3% of convictions were for traffic offences.

In the same year, 15,064 minors (78.3% of them male, 68.2% of them of Swiss nationality, 76.3% aged between 15 and 18) were convicted.

The number of convicted persons is given in the following tables. Each class of crime references the relevant section of the Strafgesetzbuch (Criminal Code, abbreviated as StGB in German), or Betäubungsmittelgesetz (abbr. BetmG, Narcotics Act), or the Strassenverkehrsgesetz (abbr. SVG, Swiss Traffic Regulations).

 2014 conviction numbers may not include convictions overturned on appeal.
 Due to privacy protection laws some convictions are not included.

 2014 conviction numbers may not include convictions overturned on appeal.
 Due to privacy protection laws some convictions are not included.

See also

List of Swiss people
Switzerland
Immigration to Europe
List of countries by immigrant population
Politics of Switzerland
Poverty in Switzerland
Metropolitan areas in Switzerland
Albanians in Switzerland
Italian immigration to Switzerland

Notes and references

External links

Swiss Federal Office of Statistics
thematic maps

 
Society of Switzerland